Iehisa (written: 家久) is a masculine Japanese given name. Notable people with the name include:

 (1687–1737), Japanese kugyō
 (1547–1587), Japanese samurai

See also
, train station in Echizen, Fukui Prefecture, Japan

Japanese masculine given names